Aapo Häkkinen (born 1976) is a Finnish harpsichordist, clavichordist and organist.

Biography and career 
Aapo Häkkinen was born in Helsinki, Finland, and began studying harpsichord at the Sibelius Academy in Helsinki when he was 13. He later studied with Bob van Asperen, at the Amsterdam Sweelinck Conservatoire, and with Pierre Hantaï in Paris. He also benefited from the guidance and encouragement of Gustav Leonhardt.

Häkkinen won second prize and the VRT prize at the Bruges International Harpsichord Competition in 1998, as well as the Norddeutscher Rundfunk special prize Musikpreis 1997. He has performed as a soloist in most European countries, and, as a chamber musician, has collaborated with Reinhard Goebel, Monica Groop, Erich Höbarth and many others. He has been a director of many ensembles, and has conducted many works, including Handel's Acis and Galatea and Haydn's L'isola disabitata for the Finnish Chamber Opera, and Monteverdi's L'incoronazione di Poppea for the Finnish National Opera.

Häkkinen will make his Edinburgh International Festival debut in August 2019 with a recital of Bach keyboard concertos.

Häkkinen teaches at the Sibelius Academy and gives master-classes around the world, and is Artistic Director of the Helsinki Baroque Orchestra.

Häkkinen has recorded music by composers such as Bach, Byrd, Frescobaldi, Haydn, Rameau, and Richter, for the AEOLUS, Alba, Avie, Cantus, Deux-Elles, and Naxos record labels. He has also recorded for numerous European radio and television companies, and hosts his own programme on Rondo Classic FM in Finland.

In addition to playing the harpsichord, Häkkinen regularly performs on the organ and on the clavichord.

References

External links
 Aapo Häkkinen Web Site
 Häkkinen's biography on the Naxos web site
 Helsinki Baroque Orchestra

Finnish harpsichordists
Finnish classical musicians
1976 births
Living people
Musicians from Helsinki
Sibelius Academy alumni